Juan Torres may refer to:
Juan de Torres, founder of Baclayon Church in Philippines in 1596
Juan Torres de Vera y Aragón, first settler in Avellaneda, Buenos Aires in 1620
Juan Torres Ribas, leader of Roman Catholic Diocese of Menorca in 1902–1939
Juan Torres, American baseballer, most valuable player in 1939 Amateur World Series
Juan José Torres (1920–1976), Bolivian socialist president
Juan Fremiot Torres Oliver (1925–2012), Catholic bishop in Puerto Rico
Juan Torres (weightlifter), Cuban weightlifter
Juan Ignacio Torres Landa (1955/6–2013), Mexican politician
Juan José Torres (athlete), Spanish runner
Juan Torres Odelín, Cuban boxer
Juan Camilo Torres, winner of 2013 Colombian Chess Championship
Juan Sablan Torres, unsuccessful vice-governor candidate in Northern Mariana Islands gubernatorial election, 2014
Juan Manuel Torres (born 1985), Argentine footballer
Juan A. Torres, entomologist who researched fauna of Puerto Rico
Juan Antonio Torres (born 1968), Mexican footballer
Juan Pablo Torres (musician) (1946–2005), Cuban musician and producer
Juan Pablo Torres (soccer) (born 1999), American soccer player

See also 
Alfredo Torres (Juan Alfredo Torres González, born 1931), Mexican footballer
Pablo Ríos (born Juan Pablo Torres Amaya, 1934–2006), Salvadorian singer
Tico Torres (Héctor Samuel Juan Torres, born 1953), American drummer
Juanfran (footballer, born 1985) (Juan Francisco Torres Belén), Spanish footballer